Dedi may refer to:

People
Dedi I, Margrave of the Saxon Ostmark (d. 1075)
Dedi II, Margrave of Lusatia (d. 1169)
Dedi III, Margrave of Lusatia (d. 1190)
Dedi Ben Dayan (b. 1978), Israeli footballer
Dedi Graucher, Israeli musician
Dedi Gusmawan (b. 1985), Indonesian footballer
Dedi Hartono (b. 1987), Indonesian footballer
Dedi Heryanto (b. 1988), Indonesian footballer
Dedi Iman (b. 1985), Indonesian footballer
Dedi Indra Sampurna (b. 1986), Indonesian footballer
Dedi Kusnandar (b. 1991), Indonesian footballer
Dedi Mulyadi (b. 1971),Indonesian politician

Places
Dedinje, Kosovo, village, called Dedi in Albanian

See also
DEDI, online encyclopedia of the natural and cultural heritage of Slovenia